Kalaignar Porkizhi Award or Kalaignar Mu. Karunanidhi Porkizhi Award is an annual literature award bestowed for Tamil and other language writers at book fair organized by the Booksellers and Publishers Association of South India (BAPASI) since 2008. Each award consists of 1 lakh rupee and the fund is managed by donation of 1 crore Rupee in 2007 by M. Karunanidhi.

Recipients

Tamil Writer
 Tamizhannal 2011
 Dr RM. Periakaruppan 2011

Poetry
 S. Abdul Rahman 2011
 Puviarasu 2008

Drama
 Prof S.Ramanujam 2011

Fiction
 C.S.Lakshmi ( Ambai )2011
 Poomani 2014

Other Literature
 Girish Karnad, (Kannada) 2009
 Arjun Dangle (Marathi) 2011
 Prof. K. Chellappan (English) 2011

References 

Tamil-language literature
Indian literary awards